Donald James Marshall (May 2, 1936 – October 30, 2016) was an American actor best known for his role as Dan Erickson in the television show Land of the Giants.

Early life
Marshall was born on May 2, 1936, to father Ernest Overton Marshall (1910-1992) and mother Alma Louise Marshall (nee Williams 1912-1993) in San Diego. He lived with his father, mother, maternal grandmother Leola Williams, his two older sisters (Leola Marceline and Ernestine), and his twin brother (Douglas). He graduated from San Diego High School in 1954. While studying engineering between 1956 and 1957, he was encouraged to try acting by a friend, Peter Bren. Marshall was still in the army at this time, but later studied acting at the Bob Gist Dramatic Workshop, while taking a course in theatre arts at Los Angeles City College. While at college, he was a pole vaulter on the track team.

Career

1960s
Marshall's first professional role was in a 1962 Columbia Studios feature The Interns in an uncredited role. In 1964, he was in Shock Treatment, another uncredited role. Also in 1964, Marshall took the role of Chris Logan, playing opposite Nichelle Nichols in CBS Repertoire Workshop episode titled "Great Gettin' Up Mornin'", a made-for-TV-movie about an African-American family preparing their children for their first day at a racially integrated school in America's South. That same year, Nichols played Marshall's fiancée in a controversial episode of Gene Roddenberry's series The Lieutenant. In 1965, Marshall appeared in a pilot for a series Premiere in the episode "Braddock". In 1966, he appeared as recurring character Luke in Daktari.

Later in the 1960s he appeared in Roddenberry's next series, Star Trek portraying Lieutenant Boma in the episode "The Galileo Seven" (1967). Other TV series he appeared in were Tarzan (the series with Ron Ely), Dragnet 1967, and Ironside. In 1968, he appeared as Ted Neumann, the recurring love interest of Julia Baker, in four episodes of the television series Julia, a series about an African-American widow raising her son on her own.

Land of the Giants
As a result of appearing in Premiere in the episode "Braddock", the actor met Irwin Allen, leading to Marshall gaining his role in Land of the Giants, in which he performed alongside Gary Conway, Don Matheson, Kurt Kasznar, Stefan Arngrim, Deanna Lund, and Heather Young. The series, created by Irwin Allen, featured Marshall as a competent African-American in a leading role. This was also a first for an African-American male in the 1960s to be featured so prominently in science fiction. The only other African-American actors to be in such a position in the 1960s were Nichelle Nichols, known for her role as Lt. Uhura in the TV series Star Trek, and Greg Morris as electronics expert Barney Collier in Mission: Impossible.

On set, the actors had to perform many of their own stunts, and here Marshall's athleticism was an asset; he credited his previous football, track, and pole vaulting work with enabling him to do many of the stunts required. In one of the episodes, "Ghost Town", while diving over a fire, Marshall actually dislocated his shoulder and the next day had to shoot new scenes with his arm in a sling. Another episode, "Giants and All That Jazz", which featured former world champion boxer Sugar Ray Robinson as Biff Bowers and Mike Mazurki as Loach, had Marshall teaching Biff Bowers how to play the trumpet. This episode, which Marshall called "Beautiful", seems to have been a favorite of his and made him want to act rather than follow or figure out what dialogue to use or say. He also claimed that actors had a better time on the set when Irwin Allen was not present; when he was, it was very different and people would get uptight.

In later years, Marshall wrote a script for a sequel to the series called Escape from a Giant Land. He hoped that it would be a big-screen production and would feature as many original cast members as possible.

1970s
Marshall had a role in the made-for-TV-movie The Reluctant Heroes, or The Egghead on Hill 656 (1971), a film that was directed by Robert Day. This war film was set in the Korean War with men under a newly commissioned lieutenant who are trapped on a hill surrounded by the enemy. His character as  Pvt. Carver LeMoyne was subject to continual racial abuse by Cpl. Leroy Sprague (Warren Oates). The film also starred Ken Berry, Jim Hutton, Ralph Meeker, Cameron Mitchell, and Trini Lopez.

Marshall was subsequently cast in the role of Dr. Fred Williams in the science-fiction horror exploitation film The Thing with Two Heads (1972), which starred Ray Milland and Rosey Grier. This was a tale about a wealthy and racist white man who has his head transplanted onto the body of a black prisoner from death row. In 1974, he was cast in Uptown Saturday Night as Slim's Henchman. In 1976, he played the part of Captain Colter in an episode of The Bionic Woman, and in 1979 he was in a two-part episode of Buck Rogers in the 25th Century as Julio. From 1978 to 1980, Marshall was in three episodes of The Incredible Hulk.

1980–2016
In the 1980s, Marshall had few roles, appearing occasionally in episodes of Little House on the Prairie as Caleb Ledoux, as Doctor Jim Blair in Finder of Lost Loves, and as Senator Ed Lawrence in Capitol. In 1992, he played the concierge in Paul Schneider's made-for-TV-movie Highway Heartbreaker. Marshall often stated that he was proud of his work on Little House. In 2011, he was in Pioneers of Television as Pvt. Ernest Cameron in archival footage from the episode titled "To Set It Right" in 1964's The Lieutenant for PBS.

After he retired from acting, Marshall set up his own company called DJM Productions, Inc., which produced television commercials and documentary films. He was popular with Star Trek fans, as he was a Star Trek convention regular.

Personal life and death
He had one daughter and one son. Marshall provided consultation on matters connected with his work and with racial issues, and received an award for "Outstanding Achievement in his field as a Black Achiever in the United States". He died on October 30, 2016,  at Cedars-Sinai Medical Center in Los Angeles. Veteran actress BarBara Luna had reported his death on Facebook.

Filmography

Film

Television

References

Sources

External links

 
 
 Irwin Allen News Network: "Land Of The Giants"

1936 births
2016 deaths
Male actors from San Diego
American male television actors
African-American male actors
Burials at Miramar National Cemetery
Los Angeles City College alumni
20th-century American male actors
20th-century African-American people
21st-century African-American people
San Diego High School alumni